Girls Forever Brave and True (also known as Girls No More) is a 1986 novel written by Caryl Rivers.

It is the sequel to the 1984 novel Virgins.

Overview
The story of three women, Peg, Constance and Kitty, that live, love and work in Washington, D.C.

References

External links
Girls Forever Brave and True at Caryl Rivers.com

1986 American novels
Sequel novels
St. Martin's Press books